"How Glorious Is Our Lord in Zion" is a hymn written in the spring of 1794 by the composer Dmitry Bortniansky to the verses of the poet Mikhail Kheraskov. It was the unofficial anthem of the Russian Empire in the late 18th - early 19th centuries.

The first public performance took place on 29 November 1798 during the ceremony of laying on the Russian Emperor Paul I the crown and other regalia of the Grand Master of the Order of St. John in the Winter Palace, and since 1801 the anthem actually supplanted the previously performed "Let the Thunder of Victory Rumble!". In 1816 it was replaced by the officially approved composition "The Prayer of Russians". From 1856 to October 1917, the chimes of the Spasskaya Tower in the Moscow Kremlin rang out the melody of the anthem. Also, before the October Revolution, it was performed by the chimes of the Peter and Paul Cathedral, and in 2003 it was restored in honor of the celebration of the anniversary of Saint Petersburg.  In 1918-1920, "If glorious" was the anthem of the Russian State, and later continued to be popular among the first wave of emigrants. During the Great Patriotic War, it was performed at the official meetings of the KONR, in fact it was the anthem of the ROA. In the modern Russian Federation, it is performed in military ceremonies when honoring - at the opening of monuments, farewell to servicemen and at burial.

The text of the hymn is based on the 48th Psalm and is replete with Christian symbolism, and its music is close to individual Voices of the Great Znamenny Chant.

The melody of the anthem was used in a German song to the lyrics "Ich bete an die Macht der Liebe" ("I pray to the power of love") by Gerhard Tersteegen. Also, the music of the anthem was used by the composer G. Beck when writing the anthem of the Jewish Socialist Party Bund "Di Shvue".

Lyrics

External links
How Glorious Is Our Lord in Zion (Cyrillic script, romanization and english translation)

References

Christian prayer
Historical national anthems
Russian anthems
Royal anthems
God in culture